The Victoria's Secret Fashion Show is an annual fashion show sponsored by Victoria's Secret. Victoria's Secret uses the show to promote and market its goods in high-profile settings. The show features some of the world's leading fashion models, such as current Victoria's Secret Angels Adriana Lima, Alessandra Ambrosio, Lily Aldridge, Lais Ribeiro, Elsa Hosk, Jasmine Tookes, Sara Sampaio, Martha Hunt, Taylor Hill, Stella Maxwell, Romee Strijd, and Josephine Skriver. Behati Prinsloo and Candice Swanepoel both missed this year's show due to their pregnancies. The show also featured PINK spokesmodels Rachel Hilbert, Zuri Tibby and Grace Elizabeth.

The Victoria's Secret Fashion Show 2016 was recorded in Paris, France at the Grand Palais. The show featured musical performances by Lady Gaga, The Weeknd, and Bruno Mars. Angel Jasmine Tookes was wearing the Victoria's Secret Fantasy Bra: The Bright Night Fantasy Bra worth $3,000,000.

Fashion show segments

Segment 1: The Road Ahead

Segment 2: Mountain Romance

Segment 3: Pink Nation

Segment 4: Secret Angel

Segment 5: Dark Angel

Segment 6: Bright Night Angel

Finale 

 Adriana Lima and  Elsa Hosk led the finale.

Index

References

External links
Official Site

Victoria's Secret
2016 in fashion